Frieda Gallati (September 12, 1876, Glarus, Switzerland — December 30, 1955, Glarus, Switzerland) was a Swiss historian.

Biography 

Frieda Gallati was born into a family of a lawyer Rudolf Gallati. Graduated from secondary school in Zurich. From 1896 she studied at the University of Zurich, where she received her doctorate in history in 1902 - the second Swiss woman to do so. In 1907 she married professor Wilhelm Melchior, from whom she divorced again in 1915.

Gallati was a specialist in the field of Swiss foreign policy during the Thirty Years' War and she is considered the most important connoisseur of Aegidius Tschudi.

References 

1876 births
1955 deaths
Academic staff of the University of Zurich
Social historians